Jelena Dokić was the defending champion, but chose not to participate this year.

Magdalena Maleeva won the title, defeating Shinobu Asagoe in the final 6–1, 6–4.

Seeds
A champion seed is indicated in bold text while text in italics indicates the round in which that seed was eliminated. The top eight seeds received a bye to the second round.

  Elena Dementieva (quarterfinals)
  Eleni Daniilidou (semifinals)
  Magdalena Maleeva (champion)
  Elena Bovina (second round)
  Nathalie Dechy (second round)
  Lisa Raymond (third round)
  Alexandra Stevenson (second round)
  Elena Likhovtseva (second round)
  Laura Granville (second round)
  Tamarine Tanasugarn (quarterfinals)
  Marie-Gayanay Mikaelian (third round)
  Dája Bedáňová (first round)
  Émilie Loit (first round)
  Cho Yoon-jeong (third round)
  Nicole Pratt (first round)
  Tina Pisnik (third round)

Draw

Finals

Top half

Section 1

Section 2

Bottom half

Section 3

Section 4

References
2003 DFS Classic Draw (Archived 2009-05-14)

DFS Classic Singles
Singles